The 1953–54 IHL season was the ninth season of the International Hockey League, a North American minor professional league. Nine teams participated in the regular season, and the Cincinnati Mohawks won the Turner Cup.

Regular season

Turner Cup-Playoffs

Turner Cup playoffs

Quarterfinals
Cincinnati Mohawks 4, Marion Barons 1

Johnstown Jets 2, Fort Wayne Komets 0

Toledo Mercurys 2, Troy Bruins 1

Semifinals
Johnstown Jets 2, Toledo Mercurys 0

Turner Cup Finals
Cincinnati Mohawks 4, Johnstown Jets 2

Awards

Coaches
Cincinnati Mohawks: Rollie McLenahan
Fort Wayne Komets: Jack Timmins, Pat Wilson
Grand Rapids Rockets: Norm Grinke
Johnstown Jets: Chirp Brenchley
Louisville Stars: Alex Woods
Marion Barons Ott Heller
Milwaukee Chiefs: Louis Trudel
Toledo Mercurys: Doug McCaig
Troy Bruins: Norm McAtee

References

Attendance Figures - Cincinnati Enquirer 03-17-1954 through 04-04-1954

External links
 Season 1953/54 on hockeydb.com

IHL
International Hockey League (1945–2001) seasons